Daviesia crassa is a species of flowering plant in the family Fabaceae and is endemic to the south-west of Western Australia. It is a compact, dense, glabrous shrub with densely crowded, thick, club-shaped phyllodes, and uniformly yellow flowers.

Description

Taxonomy and naming
Daviesia crassa was first formally described in 1995 by Michael Crisp in Australian Systematic Botany from specimens he collected near Harrismith in 1979. The specific epithet (crassa) means "thick", referring to the phyllodes.

Distribution and habitat
This species of pea grows in kwongan heath between Wagin and Harrismith in the Avon Wheatbelt biogeographic region of south-western Western Australia.

Conservation status
Daviesia crassa is classified as "Priority Four" by the Government of Western Australia Department of Biodiversity, Conservation and Attractions, meaning that is rare or near threatened.

References

crassa
Eudicots of Western Australia
Plants described in 1995
Taxa named by Michael Crisp